APEX Business-IT Global Case Challenge is an annual case competition held in Singapore that highlights the intertwined nature of business and information technology (IT). The competition is organised by the School of Information Systems (SIS) at Singapore Management University (SMU). It attracts third or fourth year participants from more than 20 universities around the world.

The APEX Business-IT Global Case Challenge is an annual event held in May which typically lasts for 4 or 5 days. Each year, the competition features a unique, “live” case which highlights genuine challenges that businesses face. Participating teams compete in a 24-hour deliberation to develop and present integrated solutions that use IT to address these challenges and meet business needs. As part of the competition, participants also partake in a topical workshop held by industry experts. The event includes social activities and business networking sessions as well.

The APEX Business-IT Global Case Challenge has traditionally enjoyed strong support from external partners through sponsorships, having company representatives as part of the judging and workshop panels. Prominent partners in previous editions include Microsoft, IBM, Citibank, Credit Suisse, Barclays and Deloitte.

APEX Business-IT Global Case Challenge 2016 took place from 3 to 6 May 2016.

History

References

Notes 

Management education